Admiral Sir Augustus Phillimore  (24 May 1822 – 25 November 1897) was a Royal Navy officer who went on to be Commander-in-Chief, Plymouth. He is credited with first proposing the creation of a modern naval dockyard in Gibraltar.

Early life 
Phillimore was born on 24 May 1822 at Whitehall in Westminster, London the son of Joseph Phillimore later a professor of civil law at Oxford and his wife Elizabeth. He was educated at Westminster before joining the Royal Navy College at Portsmouth.

Naval career 
Phillimore joined the Royal Navy in 1835. He served in the Carlist Wars and in the First Opium War. Promoted Commander in 1852, he was given command of HMS Medea in 1853 and, promoted Captain in 1855, he commanded HMS Curacoa and then HMS Defence.

He was appointed Senior officer Jamaica Division in 1868 and in charge of Jamaica Dockyard. Then Senior officer at Gibraltar in 1869 when he would have stayed in The Mount (Gibraltar). In 1871 he made the proposal that a new naval dockyard should be constructed in Gibraltar. Phillimore's scheme lied dormant in the Admiralty for 22 years before it was put to Parliament in 1895. The idea was to take five years and just under £1.5m pounds. In 1896 the scheme was further extended with the creation of new moles and three dry docks and a new budget of £4.5m pounds. The transformation was large and the government were still passing enabling legislation in 1905. Today the docks are known as Gibdock.

Phillimore became Second-in-command of the Channel Squadron in January 1876 and Superintendent of the Royal Naval Reserve in November 1876. Promoted Admiral in October 1884, he was made Commander-in-Chief, Plymouth in December 1884. He retired in 1887.

Family 
In 1864 he married Harriet Eleanor Fortescue; they had six sons (George Grenville Phillimore, Charles Augustus Phillimore, Captain Valentine Egerton Bagot Phillimore, Admiral Sir Richard Phillimore, and John Swinnerton Phillimore Reverend Edward Granville Phillimore) and one daughter Violet Elizabeth Phillimore.

He died at his home at Shedfield House near Botley, Hampshire on 25th November 1897.

See also

References 

1822 births
1897 deaths
Royal Navy admirals
Knights Commander of the Order of the Bath
People from Westminster
People educated at Westminster School, London
Fellows of the Royal Geographical Society
People from Botley, Hampshire